Heliothrix oregonensis is a phototrophic filamentous, gliding bacterium  containing bacteriochlorophyll a
that is aerotolerant and photoheterotrophic.

References

Further reading
 Boomer, Sarah M.  Characterization of a hot-spring bacterium resembling Heliothrix oregonensis. Diss. University of Puget Sound, 1989. 
 Blankenship, Robert E., Michael T. Madigan, and Carl E. Bauer, eds. Anoxygenic photosynthetic bacteria. Vol. 2. Springer, 1995. 
 Renger, Gernot, ed.  Primary processes of photosynthesis: principles and apparatus. Royal Society of Chemistry, 2008.

External links

 
 LPSN

Phototrophic bacteria
Chloroflexota
Bacteria described in 1986